Mariana Paulina Torres González (born December 5, 1985, in León, Guanajuato, Mexico) is a Mexican actress, known for telenovelas. She is a daughter of José Torres and she has 4 brothers.

Biography 
She debuted as actress in 2001 her native Mexico working in TV Azteca produced serials, and obtained her first leading role in a telenovela by the name of Belinda in 2004.

Most recently she has lived in Miami, Florida, where she has participated in three telenovelas produced there in Pecados Ajenos, Acorralada and Sacrificio de Mujer.

Filmography

References

External links

1987 births
Living people
People from León, Guanajuato
Actresses from Guanajuato
Mexican television actresses
Mexican telenovela actresses
People educated at Centro de Estudios y Formación Actoral
21st-century Mexican actresses